Case Jaundice is a Bengali comedy web series which has a very interesting concept. It is a series that has been made entirely during the lockdown period. Directed by Subhankar Chattopadhyay the web series and shorts shot during the lockdown period of the COVID-19 Pandemic. All the cast and crew members have worked in the limitation of shooting remotely from home. In the web series all the characters communicated through phone and video calls.

Description 
The series features only three characters, Two lawyers and one Judge played by Parambrata Chatterjee (Mr. Sen), Ankush Hazra (Mr. Das) and Anirban Chakraborty (Judge).
This anthology comedy series has ten episodes containing 10 different topics. Two layers battling it out on a variety of subjects relating to the COVID-19 crisis, including the use of masks to commit petty crimes, the existential crisis faced by movie theatres, and so on and so forth.  The series started streaming on the Bengali OTT platform hoichoi from 15 May 2020.

Cast 
Parambrata Chatterjee as Mr. Sen
Ankush Hazra as Mr. Das 
Anirban Chakraborty as the Judge

Episodes

Season 1
The series started streaming from 15 May 2020 with five episodes. Later on, 29 May hoichoi released more five episodes.

References

External links

Indian web series
2017 web series debuts
Bengali-language web series
Hoichoi original programming